Tayla McAuliffe (born 15 March 1999) is an Australian rules footballer who played for the Fremantle Football Club in the AFL Women's (AFLW). After being overlooked in the national draft days earlier, McAuliffe was eventually drafted by Fremantle with their fourth selection and 19th and final pick overall in the 2017 AFL Women's rookie draft.

References

External links 

1999 births
Living people
Fremantle Football Club (AFLW) players
Australian rules footballers from Western Australia